Howard Elmer Armstrong (December 2, 1889 – March 8, 1926) was an American Major League Baseball pitcher. He played for the Philadelphia Athletics during the  season

Armstrong married Lucy Irene Douglas (October 15, 1899–1989) of Clarion, Ohio, who met Armstrong while he was boarding with Lucy's mother, Mae Brewster Douglass. They eloped, in 1916 to Hamilton, Ontario. Mae was not happy about the marriage and set Pinkerton after the couple, but they were already married. The couple had three children, Robert, James, and Thomas.

Armstrong played for factory baseball teams in Ohio and Canisteo and was well known locally.

Howard Armstrong died in 1926, most likely of a staph infection. His immediate family remained in the Canisteo area, with seven grandchildren and many great-grandchildren, living throughout the country.

References

Major League Baseball pitchers
Philadelphia Athletics players
Baseball players from Ohio
1889 births
1926 deaths
Savannah Indians players
Savannah Colts players
Hamilton Hams players
Hamilton Tigers (baseball) players
People from Canisteo, New York